Jezdimir Vasiljević (born in Topolovnik, People's Republic of Serbia, Yugoslavia in November 1948), nicknamed Gazda Jezda ("Jezda the Boss"), is a Serbian convicted criminal and television personality. He is most known for running a nation-wide Ponzi scheme in the Federal Republic of Yugoslavia in the 90s. In 1992, he established the Jugoskandik Savings Bank, the first privately owned bank in Serbia (which was, at the time, part of Federal Republic of Yugoslavia). Although Jugoskandik operated in Serbia, the banking license was provided by Banka Privatne Privrede (BPP), bank owned by the local government of Montenegro (another constituent republic within Yugoslavia). He unsuccessfully ran for President of Serbia in the 1992 election.

Vasiljević also organized and sponsored the 1992 match between Bobby Fischer and Boris Spassky, which took place in the exclusive resort of Sveti Stefan and drew significant media attention both in Yugoslavia and abroad. Since Yugoslavia was under UN sanctions at the time, participation in the match caused Bobby Fischer legal trouble and practically forced him to live as an émigré.

According to some sources, Vasiljević's initial investment capital was made through a marriage with a Swedish woman from a wealthy family. However, Jugoskandik itself was merely a front for a Ponzi Scheme (this scheme was also described in his country as a Pyramid scheme, although the two terms are not entirely identical in meaning) . The obtained money was used to bypass internationally imposed sanctions and import oil into Yugoslavia via Montenegrin seaports. The oil was later sold within Yugoslavia (mostly in Serbia), and Jugoskandik savers were paid off from the profit. According to Vasiljević's own words, at the request of BPP's CEO Milorad Vukotić, some 62,000 tons of oil were confiscated from the Montenegrin repositories in Bar and Kotor, a move which marked the end of Jugoskandik. The Jugoskandik collapse, together with the almost simultaneous collapse of another pyramidal bank, Dafiment, represented a disastrous blow to the Serbian economy, already weakened by the Yugoslav Wars. An estimated 80,000 people were left without their money. Vasiljević sued the state of Montenegro in 1993, but without success. He fled Yugoslavia on the 8th of March 1993.

Vasiljević made claims that, in early 1993, he supplied the Serbian side in the Yugoslav wars with a "Hertz-machine", allegedly a machine which kills people via phone by emitting strong frequencies. Such claims were almost immediately debunked by the Serbian media.

In 2001, Vasiljević and the PBB's ex-CEO were charged separately for embezzlement. In 2004, Vasiljević's trial began in front of the Serbian court of law; he escaped to the Netherlands, where he was arrested and extradited to Serbia. He was sentenced to five years of prison.

In 2013, Vasiljević entered the popular reality show "Farma", but was kicked off due to low votes.

References

Bibliography

1948 births
Living people
Serbian businesspeople
Serbian criminals
Pyramid and Ponzi schemes
Serbia and Montenegro people
Chess patrons